Takuya Wada (和田 拓也, born 28 July 1990) is a Japanese football player. He plays for Yokohama FC.

Club statistics
Updated to 23 October 2022.

Honours

Club
Yokohama F. Marinos
J1 League: 2019

References

External links
Profile at Sanfrecce Hiroshima

1990 births
Living people
Association football people from Kanagawa Prefecture
Japanese footballers
J1 League players
J2 League players
Tokyo Verdy players
Vegalta Sendai players
Omiya Ardija players
Sanfrecce Hiroshima players
Yokohama F. Marinos players
Yokohama FC players
Association football defenders